Life Coach is a studio album by Phil Manley of the band Trans Am, released in 2011.

References

2011 albums